Marcel Thoreau (20 August 1896 – 4 May 1964) was a French racing cyclist. He rode in the 1922 Tour de France.

References

1896 births
1964 deaths
French male cyclists
Place of birth missing